Aleksandr Olegovich Kutitsky (born 1 January 2002) is a Russian football player who plays for FC Dynamo Moscow.

Club career
Kutitsky  was first included in the senior squad of FC Dynamo Moscow in November 2020 and subsequently joined them for their January 2021 training camp.

He made his debut for FC Dynamo Moscow on 20 February 2021 in a Russian Cup game against FC Spartak Moscow. He substituted Sergei Parshivlyuk in the 82nd minute of a 2–0 home victory.

Kutitsky made his Russian Premier League debut for Dynamo on 23 July 2021 in a game against FC Rostov, he substituted Nikola Moro in the 75th minute.

On 15 December 2022, Kutitsky extended his contract with Dynamo until 2026.

Career statistics

References

External links
 
 

2002 births
Footballers from Moscow
Living people
Russian footballers
Russia under-21 international footballers
Association football midfielders
Association football defenders
FC Dynamo Moscow players
Russian Premier League players
Russian Second League players